The Bootlicker is the eleventh studio album by the Melvins, released in 1999 through Ipecac Recordings. The album is the second part of a trilogy preceded by The Maggot and followed by The Crybaby. The trilogy was later released on vinyl by Ipecac (The Trilogy Vinyl, IPC-011, November 27, 2000).

Production
The Bootlicker was conceived as a more pop-oriented album; The Maggot was marked by a traditional Melvins metal sound, while The Crybaby featured many guest appearances.

Critical reception
The Los Angeles Times wrote: "While The Maggot offers more familiar-sounding, metal-tinged sludge, The Bootlicker is a musically richer collection with rock, funk and jazz underpinnings." The Riverfront Times called The Bootlicker "one of the best rock albums of the year: truly beautiful and intelligently (but not pretentiously) presented." Tucson Weekly called it "subdued, dark and kind of pop-y sounding in spots."

Track listing

Personnel
King Buzzo – vocals, guitar, noises
Dale Crover – drums, percussion, vocals
Kevin Rutmanis – bass, slide bass
with
Eric Peterson - piano (track 9)

Additional personnel
Tim Green – producer
Mackie Osborne – art

References

Bootlicker
Bootlicker, The
Bootlicker
Sludge metal albums